Glycoprotein Ib (GPIb), also known as CD42,
is a component of the GPIb-V-IX complex on platelets.  The GPIb-V-IX complex binds von Willebrand factor, allowing platelet adhesion and platelet plug formation at sites of vascular injury.

It is deficient in the Bernard–Soulier syndrome. A gain-of-function mutation causes platelet-type von Willebrand disease.

Autoantibodies against Ib/IX can be produced in immune thrombocytopenic purpura.

Components include GP1BA and GP1BB.

It complexes with Glycoprotein IX.

References

External links
 

Glycoproteins